Great Guitars is an album by blues guitarist Joe Louis Walker.  It was released in 1997 on the Polygram label as catalogue number 537141.

Many of the songs on the album are duets with other artists.  The album received mostly favourable reviews upon its release.

Track listing
"Low Down Dirty Blues" (Walker) – 6:57
"First Degree" (Turner, Walker) – 4:22
"Mile-Hi Club" (Walker) – 6:08
"Fix Our Love" (Walker) – 6:05
"Every Girl I See" (Dixon, Murphy) – 6:01
"Cold and Evil Night" (Walker) – 5:23
"Hop on It" (Grand, Walker) – 2:24
"Nighttime" (Walker) – 5:49
"Sugar" (Walker) – 6:21
"In God's Hands" (Walker) – 4:28
"High Blood Pressure" (Walker) – 4:39

Personnel
Musicians
Joe Louis Walker: vocals, guitar, slide guitar, percussion, footstomping, arrangements
Tom Rose:  guitar, backing vocals
Mike Eppley:  organ, piano and backing vocals
Joe Thomas:  bass, backing vocals
Curtis Nutall:  drums
Guest musicians
Bonnie Raitt:  vocals and slide guitar on "Low Down Dirty Blues"
Ike Turner:  guitar, keyboards, bass and tambourine on "First Degree"
Buddy Guy:  guitar on "Every Girl I See"
Matt Murphy:  guitar on "Nighttime"
Taj Mahal:  national steel guitar, ratchet guitar and footstomps on "In God's Hands"
Robert Lockwood, Jr.:  12-string electric guitar on "High Blood Pressure"
Otis Grand:  guitar and lap-steel guitar on "Hop on It"
Scotty Moore:  guitar
Little Charlie Baty:  guitar
Steve Cropper:  guitar on "Mile-Hi Club"
Clarence Gatemouth Brown:  guitar on "Mile-Hi Club"
Otis Rush; vocals and guitar on "Fix Our Love"
Charles "D.C." Carnes:  guitar
Wallace Coleman:  harmonica
Steve Diamond:  piano
Richard Smith:  bass
Steve Gomes; bass
Rob Stupka; drums
Jimmy "Gator" Hoare
The Tower of Power Horns:
Emilio Castillo:  saxophone
Bill Churchville:  horn arrangements, trumpet
Barry Danielian:  horn arrangements, trumpet
Stephen "Doc" Kupka:  baritone saxophone
John Scarpulla:  saxophone
The Johnny Nocturne Horns: 
John Firmin:  tenor sax
Rob Sudduth:  baritone sax
George Spencer:  trumpet
Marty Wehner:  horn arrangements, trombone
Production
Produced by Joe Louis Walker, Ike Turner, Steve Cropper, John Snyder
 Executive producer: Jean-Philippe Allard.
 Engineered by Scotty Moore, David Luke, Howard Willing, Jay Newland, Jim Albert, Ken Kessie, Mark Hewitt, Mike Creswell, Paul Haumann, Stephen Hart, Steve Spaperri
 Assistant Engineers: Ben Conrad, John Brant.
 Mastered by Chris Bellman.

References

Blues albums by American artists
1997 albums